Vegueros de Pinar del Río (English: Pinar del Río Meadow Growers) is a baseball team in the Cuban National Series. Based in the western city of Pinar del Río, the Vegueros are historically one of the more successful teams in the Cuban National Series, winning championships in 1997, 1998, 2011, 2015.

History
Prior to the 1992-93 Cuban National Series, two teams competed in the province of Pinar del Río: Forestales (also known as Pinar del Río during some seasons) and Vegueros. Vegueros was a bona fide powerhouse, winning the championship in 1978, 1981, 1982, 1985, 1987 and 1988. A 1992–1993 contraction of the league, in which eight teams were eliminated, caused Vegueros and Forestales to be combined into a single team.

In 2015, Pinar del Río won the Caribbean Series, becoming the first Cuban winner since 1960.

Roster

Past stars
Pitchers: Omar Ajete, Jesús Bosmenier, Faustino Corrales, Reinaldo Costa, Rogelio García, Jesús Guerra, Pedro Luis Lazo, Juan Carlos Oliva, Félix Pino, Julio Romero, Emilio Salgado
Infielders: Giraldo González, Félix Iglesias, Carmelo Pedroso, Alexei Ramirez, Alfonso Urquiola, Omar Linares
Catchers: Juan Castro
Outfielders: Luis Giraldo Casanova, Jose Enrrique Camejo, Lázaro Madera

Emigrants
Several Pinar del Río players have left Cuba for the North American Major Leagues.
 José Contreras (pitcher)
 Alay Soler (pitcher)
 Juan Miranda (infielder)
 Danys Báez (pitcher)
 Alexei Ramírez (outfielder)
 Yosvany Madera (catcher)

References

Baseball teams in Cuba
Pinar del Río
Baseball teams established in 1992
1992 establishments in Cuba